Buzebazeba is an administrative ward in Kigoma-Ujiji District of Kigoma Region in Tanzania. 
In 2016 the Tanzania National Bureau of Statistics report there were 20,304 people in the ward, from 18,446 in 2012.

Villages / neighborhoods 
The ward has 15 villages and neighborhoods.

 Burega
 Jumbe
 Karuta
 Lake tanganyika
 Lumumba
 Mandela
 Mikoroshini
 Ngwandu
 Samora
 Shindika
 Sokoine
 Tanu
 Vamia

References

Wards of Kigoma Region